The Tashkent riffle bleak (Alburnoides oblongus) is a fish species of family Cyprinidae. Widespread in the Central Asia in Syr-Darya basin. Benthopelagic temperate freshwater fish, up to 14.2 cm in length.

References 

 

Alburnoides
Fish described in 1923
Freshwater fish
Fish of Central Asia